Biomphalaria havanensis, common name the ghost rams-horn, is a species of air-breathing freshwater snail, an aquatic pulmonate gastropod mollusk in the family Planorbidae, the ram's horn snails.

The shell of this species, like all planorbids is sinistral in coiling, but is carried upside down and thus appears to be dextral.

Distribution 
Biomphalaria havanensis is a Neotropical species.

Distribution of Biomphalaria havanensis include:
 Cuba

It was found as a native transplant in:
 pond near Snake River in Twin Falls County, Idaho in 1991.
 Guadalupe River, Kerr County, Texas

Phylogeny 
A cladogram showing phylogenic relations of species in the genus Biomphalaria:

References

External links 
 https://nas.er.usgs.gov/queries/FactSheet.asp?speciesID=1030

Biomphalaria
Gastropods described in 1839